Pseudoweinmannia is an endemic Australian genus with two species of trees of the family Cunoniaceae. Both species lack petals.
 Pseudoweinmannia lachnocarpa
 Pseudoweinmannia apetala

The name refers to the similarity of another genus, Weinmannia, after the German eighteenth century pharmacist J.W. Weinmann.

References

Cunoniaceae
Oxalidales genera
Trees of Australia
Flora of New South Wales
Flora of Queensland